The 1948 Oxford-Cambridge rugby union tour of Argentina was a series of matches played in Argentina by a mixed selection of players from Oxford and Cambridge universities in 1948. The matches were held in Buenos Aires and Rosario.

After some contacting the previous years, the Argentine Rugby Union then, "River Plate Rugby Union" hosted, with the help of clubs Gimnasia y Esgrima de Buenos Aires and Hindú, this selection, formed also of many international players of British national team.

It was the first (of a total of four) tours of this British team on Argentina.

The team 
 C. R. Hopwood (manager) 
 A. Matthews (referee) 

 S. C. Newman
 S. M. Duff
 David Swarbrick
 D. J. W. Bridge
 J. B. Raine
 Alan Stewart
 M. T. Maloney
 Clive van Ryneveld
 J. H. Galbraith
 Arthur Dorward
 P. J. de A. Moore
 T. S. Mc Roberts
 E. C. C. Wynter
 R. V. Thompson
 C. G. Gilthorpe
 G. A. Wilson (Capt.)
 Peter Kininmonth
 A. P. de Nobriga
 E. Bole
 Anthony van Ryneveld
 R. D. Gill
 John Kendall-Carpenter
 Barry Holmes

Results 

Notes

References 

1948 rugby union tours
Rugby
1948
1948
1948–49 in English rugby union